Vyatta is a software-based virtual router, virtual firewall and VPN products for Internet Protocol networks (IPv4 and IPv6). A free download of Vyatta has been available since March 2006. The system is a specialized Debian-based Linux distribution with networking applications such as Quagga, OpenVPN, and many others. A standardized management console, similar to Juniper JUNOS or Cisco IOS, in addition to a web-based GUI and traditional Linux system commands, provides configuration of the system and applications. In recent versions of Vyatta, web-based management interface is supplied only in the subscription edition. However, all functionality is available through KVM, serial console or SSH/telnet protocols. The software runs on standard x86-64 servers.

Vyatta is also delivered as a virtual machine file and can provide (VPN) functionality for Xen, VMware, KVM, Rackspace, SoftLayer, and Amazon EC2 virtual and cloud computing environments. As of October, 2012, Vyatta has also been available through Amazon Marketplace and can be purchased as a service to provide VPN, cloud bridging and other network functions to users of Amazon's AWS services.

Vyatta sells a subscription edition that includes all the functionality of the open source version as well as a graphical user interface, access to Vyatta's RESTful API's, Serial Support, TACACS+, Config Sync, System Image Cloning, software updates, 24x7 phone and email technical support, and training. Certification as a Vyatta Professional is now available. Vyatta also offers professional services and consulting engagements.

The Vyatta system is intended as a replacement for Cisco IOS 1800 through ASR 1000 series Integrated Services Routers (ISR) and ASA 5500 security appliances, with a strong emphasis on the cost and flexibility inherent in an open source, Linux-based system running on commodity x86 hardware or in VMware ESXi, Microsoft Hyper-V, Citrix XenServer, Open Source Xen and KVM virtual environments.

In 2012, Brocade Communications Systems acquired Vyatta.

In June 2017, Brocade sold Vyatta Software Technology to AT&T Communications.

In September 2021, AT&T supplier Ciena Corporation announced an agreement to acquire the Vyatta talent and assets.

Vyatta Core 
The free community Vyatta Core software (VC) was an open source network operating system providing advanced IPv4 and IPv6 routing, stateful firewalling, secure communication through both an IPSec based VPN as well as through the SSL based OpenVPN.

In October 2013, an independent group started a fork of Vyatta Core under the name VyOS.

In March 2018, ATT released a new open source project based on the proprietary Brocade version of Vyatta under the name DANOS.

Release History

References

External links 
 Open Source Community
 

2005 establishments in California
2021 mergers and acquisitions
Linux companies
Routing software
Gateway/routing/firewall distribution
Free routing software
Computer security software companies
Free security software
Free software distributions
Debian-based distributions
Routers (computing)
Virtual private networks
Software companies established in 2005
Companies based in San Mateo County, California
Computer networking
Networking software companies
Virtualization software
Ethernet
Networking companies of the United States
AT&T subsidiaries
Linux distributions